Figliuzzi is a surname. Notable people with the surname include:

Frank Figliuzzi (born 1962), American intelligence agent and government executive
Stephan Figliuzzi (born 1968), Italian ice hockey player

Italian-language surnames